Ramon is an urban locality (an urban-type settlement) and the administrative center of Ramonsky District of Voronezh Oblast, Russia. Population: 

It was first mentioned in 1615. It was granted urban-type settlement status in 1938.

In 1879 Tsar Alexander II gave the estate of Ramon to his niece Princess Eugenia Maximilianovna of Leuchtenberg and her husband Duke Alexander Petrovich of Oldenburg as a wedding gift; she set up industrial and agricultural enterprises, expanded the estate, and in the 1880s commissioned the building of Ramon Palace, which has survived and is now a Russian cultural landmark.

References

Notes

Sources

Urban-type settlements in Voronezh Oblast
Populated places in Ramonsky District
Voronezhsky Uyezd